The 2006 24 Hours of Le Mans was the 74th Grand Prix of Endurance, and took place over 17–18 June 2006. The winners of the race were Frank Biela, Marco Werner, and Emanuele Pirro, driving the Audi R10 TDI. For the first time in the history of the race, the winner was a diesel-powered car.

Pre-race
Prior to this race the ACO redeveloped the area around the Dunlop Curve and Dunlop Chicane, moving the Dunlop Curve in tighter to create more run-off area, while also turning the Dunlop Chicane into a larger set of turns. As part of the development, a new extended pit lane exit was created for motorcycles running the Bugatti Circuit. This second pit exit re-enters the track just beyond the Dunlop Chicane and before the Dunlop Bridge.

Before the official test days, the FIA requested that the sportscars should also use this new pit lane, and mandated a 60 km/h speed limit for the entire 450m length, instead of using the normal pit exit in the Dunlop Curve as planned. This was originally used for the Le Mans test days, but due to complaints from the teams, the ACO decided to return to the old pit lane exit for the race.

Qualifying
In the LMP1 category, during Wednesday's wet-weather qualifying Pescarolo C60 took the top two spots. Then, a day later, during dry weather conditions the new Audi R10 TDIs overtook the Pescarolos to claim the top two positions. 

In LMP2, the Ray Mallock Ltd. Lola ran two seconds quicker than the new Intersport Lola.

In LMGT1, the Aston Martin factory squad swept the front row, with the #64 Corvette right behind them. 

In GT2, the French IMSA Performance Matmut Porsche took the quickest time; however, Luca Riccitelli took the car off at Nord du Karting at the end of the session, injuring his ankle and badly damaging the chassis of the car. In a unique move, the ACO went against its own rules and granted permission for the team to replace the chassis with a brand new car. The car was still forced to start at the back of the grid. The Scuderia Ecosse Ferrari 430 thus started at the front for the GT2 class.

Qualifying times
Class leaders and the fastest lap time on each day are in bold.

Race

This race marked the first Le Mans win for a diesel engined sports car, the Audi R10 TDI, and the second time that a diesel-powered sports car won a major international motorsports event, following the Audi R10 TDI's win at the 2006 12 Hours of Sebring.

This race also marked the first time since the 1991 24 Hours of Le Mans that Porsche (or a Porsche-powered prototype) did not win at least one class. A Panoz Esperante was successful in upsetting the contingent of Porsches in the GT2 class.

Corvette Racing's 355 lap pace in their GT1 class win became the record for a homologated GT vehicle.

Official results

Class winners are marked in bold. Cars not completing 70% of the winner's distance are listed as Not Classified (NC).

Statistics

 Fastest Lap - #7 Audi Sport Team Joest - 3:31.211
 Distance - 5187.0 km
 Average Speed - 215.409 km/h
 Highest trap speed - #14 Racing for Holland - 331 km/h (warm-up), #9 Creation Autosportif - 332 km/h (qualifying)

References

Le Mans
24 Hours of Le Mans races
24 Hours of Le Mans
Le Mans, 24 Hours of